Ethan Tracy (born November 10, 1989) is an American professional golfer.

Scholastic career 
Tracy attended Hilliard Darby High School and in college competed for the Arkansas Razorbacks where he was all-Southeastern Conference.

Amateur career 
Tracy won the 2011 Western Amateur.

Professional career 
Tracy has four mini-tour wins.

Tracy played the 2015 season on PGA Tour Canada (best finish – T7 at the Bayview Place Island Savings Open) and PGA Tour Latinoamérica (best finish – T2 at the Lexus Panama Classic). He finished 22nd on the Canadian money list and 40th on the Latinoamérican list.

At the 2016 U.S. Open, he made the cut and finished tied for 65th.

Professional wins (5)

Web.com Tour wins (1)

Web.com Tour playoff record (1–0)

Results in major championships

CUT = missed the half-way cut
"T" indicates a tie for a place

See also
2017 Web.com Tour Finals graduates

References

External links

American male golfers
Arkansas Razorbacks men's golfers
PGA Tour golfers
Korn Ferry Tour graduates
Golfers from Columbus, Ohio
1989 births
Living people